Stonebridge is a golf course community in Ottawa, Ontario, Canada.

The community borders the Jock river to the north, Prince of Wales to the east, Barnsdale to the south, and Greenbank to the west. Main through-roads include Jockvale and Greenbank.

The Stonebridge Golf Club, an 18-hole course, snakes through the community, and borders Jockvale road. The Stonebridge Community Association manages community events including summer and winter sports for kids.

Stonebridge has several parks, many including splash pads and fields. A new city-run community centre, the Minto Recreation Complex, includes a Gymnasium, a weight and exercise room, two pools, two skating rinks, a walking track, and several multi-use rooms. There is also a CFL-sized artificial playing football field to the south-east of the building.

Homes in the area were built by several builders, including Minto, Mattamy, Monarch, and Uniform.

In July 2019, residents of Stonebridge voted in favour of a levy, to be paid by residents, to purchase golf course land owned by Mattamy Homes. The levy will stall any further development of homes on golf course land for an additional ten years.

References

Neighbourhoods in Ottawa